El amor tiene cara de mujer may refer to

 El amor tiene cara de mujer (Argentine TV series)
 El amor tiene cara de mujer (Mexican TV series)